The Canal du Grand Morin is a canal in northern France, near Paris, that connected the Grand Morin River to the Canal de Meaux à Chalifert. Today it serves largely as a feeder canal to the  Canal de Meaux à Chalifert.

See also
 List of canals in France

References

External links
 Power point description
 Project Babel

Morin